Bandeirantes do Tocantins is a municipality located in the Brazilian state of Tocantins.

References

Municipalities in Tocantins